Sundown on the Forest is an album by the rock group Kingfish.  It was recorded over a period of several years with different combinations of musicians, and released in 1999.  It was the first studio album by Kingfish since Trident in 1978.

The various musical lineups on Sundown on the Forest include past and present members of Kingfish, such as Matthew Kelly, Steve Kimock, Barry Sless, Barry Flast, Danny "Rio" DeGennaro, Fred Campbell, Mookie Siegel, Robbie Hoddinott, Jimmy Sanchez, and Ana Rizzo.  A number of guest musicians and singers also perform on the album, including Jenni Muldaur, the daughter of Maria Muldaur.

Bob Weir of the Grateful Dead, another former member of Kingfish, appears on several songs, and sings lead vocals on "Padlock Cufflinks", as well as a duet with Barry Flast on "Starship Ride".  Jerry Garcia plays guitar on "Ridin' High", a track created by combining a recording session from 1973 with newly recorded parts.

Track listing 

 "Hurt Enough" (Barry Flast)
 "Sundown on the Forest" (Barry Flast, Michael Johnson)
 "It Don't Take Much" (Marcus Strange)
 "Burning in My Heart" (Barry Flast)
 "Ridin' High" (Bill Cutler)
 "Padlock Cufflinks" (James A. Nelson III, Barry Flast)
 "Goodbye, So Long" (Marcus Strange)
 "Every Little Light" (Matthew Kelly, Marcus Strange)
 "Eyes of the Night" (Barry Flast)
 "It Takes a Lot to Laugh, It Takes a Train to Cry" (Bob Dylan)
 "My Baby Left Me" (Arthur Crudup)
 "Tennessee Blues" (Bobby Charles)
 "Starship Ride" (Country Joe McDonald)
 "Jump for Joy" (John Carter, Tim Gilbert)

Personnel

Musicians 

 Matthew Kelly – guitar, harmonica, vocals
 Danny DeGennaro – vocals
 Barry Flast – piano, vocals, keyboard bass
 Rick Anderson – bass
 Fred Campbell – bass, acoustic guitar, vocals
 Caitlen Cornwell – vocals
 Jerry Cortez – guitar
 Bill Cutler – vocals
 Greg Douglas – guitar
 Zoe Ellis – vocals
 Jerry Garcia – guitar
 Robbie Hoddinott – guitar
 Steve Kimock – guitar
 Jenni Muldaur – vocals
 James A. Nelson III – percussion
 Eric Parker – drums
 Ray Parnell – guitar
 David Perper – drums
 Jimmy Pew – keyboards
 Robert Powell – pedal steel guitar
 Ari Rios – vocals
 Ana Rizzo – vocals
 Jimmy Sanchez – drums
 Mookie Siegel – piano, Hammond B3 organ, electric piano, synth flute, percussion
 David Simon-Baker – acoustic guitar
 Barry Sless – guitar, pedal steel guitar
 Bobby Vega – bass
 Bob Weir – acoustic guitar, vocals

Production 

 Matthew Kelly and Barry Flast – producers
 Ari Rios, David Simon-Baker – mixing and mastering
 Stephen Hart, Michael Semanick – basic track engineers
 Eric Thompson – asst. engineer
 Tad Flynn – executive producer
 Mark Perlson – project coordinator
 Bruce Harman – cover artwork
 Sharon Carson – Kingfish logo design
 Yalitza Ferreras – design and layout
 Joanie Grayson, Robin Gascon – Kingfish's management

References 

Kingfish (band) albums
1999 albums